Florida's 23rd congressional district is an electoral district for the U.S. Congress, located in the Greater Miami area and covering parts of Broward County and southern Palm Beach County. In the 2020 redistricting cycle, it was drawn as a successor to the previous 22nd district and includes Boca Raton, Coral Springs, most of Deerfield Beach and Fort Lauderdale, and parts of Pompano Beach. The previous iteration of the 23rd district, which included Davie and Pembroke Pines, was instead renamed the 25th district. The district, along with two other districts in Greater Miami, has one of the highest concentrations of Jewish Americans, consisting of about 16% of the electorate.

From 2003 to 2013, the former 23rd district consisted of a major part of Broward County and parts of Palm Beach county. The district included Pompano Beach, Boynton Beach and Belle Glade.

From 2013 to 2023, the district included cities such as Weston, Davie, Pembroke Pines, and Aventura, as well as Fort Lauderdale–Hollywood International Airport and Nova Southeastern University.

The district is currently represented by Democrat Jared Moskowitz.

History
Florida's 23rd Congressional District was created after the 1990 U.S. Census. Democrat Alcee Hastings was elected in the first election for the district in 1992 until being redistricted to the 20th 
Congressional District in 2013.

Statewide election results

Presidential election results
Results from previous presidential elections

Non-presidential results
Results from previous non-presidential statewide elections

List of members representing the district

Election results

2002

2004

2006

2008

2010

2012

2014

2016

2018

2020

2022

References

 Congressional Biographical Directory of the United States 1774–present

External links
Rep. Debbie Wasserman Schultz's official House of Representatives website

22
1993 establishments in Florida